John Gloninger (September 19, 1758January 22, 1836) was a member of the U.S. House of Representatives from Pennsylvania.

Biography
John Gloninger was born in Lebanon Township in the Province of Pennsylvania.  He served as a subaltern officer in the Associaters during the Revolutionary War and later was in command of a battalion of militia.  Upon the organization of Dauphin County, Pennsylvania, he was appointed a lieutenant by the supreme executive council on May 6, 1785.  He was a member of the Pennsylvania House of Representatives in 1790.  He resigned and served in the Pennsylvania State Senate from 1790 until 1792.  He was appointed by Governor Thomas Mifflin as justice of the peace of Dauphin County on September 8, 1790.  He was commissioned as associate judge on August 17, 1791, and upon the formation of Lebanon County, Pennsylvania, he was commissioned on September 11, 1813, as one of the associate judges for that county.

Gloninger was elected as a Federalist to the Thirteenth Congress and until his resignation on August 2, 1813.  He was again appointed associate judge of Lebanon County and died in Lebanon, Pennsylvania.  Interment in First Reformed Churchyard.

Sources

The Political Graveyard

1758 births
1836 deaths
People from Lebanon, Pennsylvania
Federalist Party members of the United States House of Representatives from Pennsylvania
Members of the Pennsylvania House of Representatives
Pennsylvania state senators
Pennsylvania state court judges
Continental Army officers from Pennsylvania